In biology, the BBCH-scale for peas describes the phenological development of peas using the BBCH-scale.

The phenological growth stages and BBCH-identification keys of peas are:

1 The first internode extends from the scale leaf node to the first true leaf node

References

 

 

BBCH-scale